Poisk ("The Search") is an IBM-compatible computer built by KPO Electronmash in Kyiv, Ukrainian SSR during the Soviet era. It is based on the K1810VM88 microprocessor, a clone of the Intel 8088. Developed since 1987 and released in 1989, it was the most common IBM-compatible computer in the Soviet Union.

The basic version did not include an expansion module for parallel or serial ports for connecting a printer, mouse or other devices. It was not fully IBM compatible, and its performance lagged behind the IBM XT. Poisk entered mass production in 1991, just before the Soviet collapse, and production output in the early 1990s reached several tens of thousands units a year.

References

Ministry of Radio Industry (USSR) computers
Computer-related introductions in 1989